Muhammad II al-Mahdi was the fourth Caliph of Córdoba of the Umayyad dynasty in Al-Andalus (Moorish Iberia). After disbanding his army of 7,000 troops, he became the source of opposition to many of his subjects. Al-Mahdi sought to defend his title as Caliph after the rise of Suleiman II as a political opponent. After a turbulent rule, in which many warring factions rose to power in an attempt to supplant al-Mahdi, he was eventually deposed. After his death, many Muslim historians accused him of destroying the sanctity of the Amirid Harem.

Sources

Umayyad caliphs of Córdoba
11th-century caliphs of Córdoba